Rui Miguel may refer to:
Rui Miguel (footballer, born 1983), Portuguese footballer who plays as a midfielder
Rui Miguel (footballer, born 1984), Portuguese footballer who plays as a forward